Gosforth Central Park is a small public park in Gosforth, north of Newcastle City Centre, Tyne and Wear, England.

History
It cost more than £10,000 and included a bandstand, bowling green, and tennis courts.

The south bowling green was opened by Mrs Blenkinsop, wife of the Chairman of Gosforth UDC, on 15 June 1934 and the bowling club was formed on 17 July 1934.
1 May 1937 saw the introduction of play area facilities.

The park was originally within Gosforth Urban District but is now in the East Gosforth Ward of Newcastle upon Tyne.

Memorials
The main memorial in the park is the War Memorial. The Memorial was moved from the north edge of the park to its current central location, on the site of the former bandstand.
Northumberland. In April 2016 the original brick plinth was resurfaced with red sandstone.

Voluntary organisations

Gosforth Central Park User Group
The Gosforth Central Park User Group was set up to support the Local Authority in the day-to-day management and longer-term development of the Park. The inaugural meeting took place 16 February 1993 at the suggestion of a local resident. The group is now (2013) defunct.

The Friends of Gosforth Central Park
The Friends of Gosforth Central Park was formed in 2013 for the encouragement of local participation in the promotion, management, maintenance and improvement of the Park and its facilities, including environmental conservation and education.  The group has been supported by local businesses.

References

External links
 
 Images of the park at Newcastle Photos blog
 Images of the park at The Tyne and Beyond blog
 Friends of Gosforth Central Park on Facebook

Parks and open spaces in Newcastle upon Tyne